Three... Extremes (Utsukushī Yoru, Zankokuna Asa) is a 2004 anthology horror film consisting of three individual segments from three different East Asian countries—China, Japan, and South Korea—following the concept of its predecessor, Three (2002).

Its three segments, Dumplings, Cut, and Box, were directed by Hong Kong director Fruit Chan, South Korean director Park Chan-wook, and Japanese director Takashi Miike, respectively. Dumplings was released as a theatrical feature film the same year, and was cut down to a shorter length for its inclusion in Three... Extremes.

Films

Dumplings
Aging actress Mrs. Li wants to rejuvenate her youth and beauty to attract the attention of her husband, Li, who has secretly taken a mistress behind her back. She buys dumplings from Aunt Mei, a mysterious seller who claims to be much older than she appears. However, to her disgust, she learns that the dumplings are in fact made from aborted fetuses, which Mei takes from a nearby hospital that has a secret abortion facility, as well as working as an abortion midwife herself.

Nevertheless, Mrs. Li decides to continue eating the fetus dumplings. One of them, made from a five-month-old fetus (the 'oldest' of the aborted fetuses thus far), seems to have a positive effect on Mrs. Li's libido, yet it also causes her skin to exhibit a fishy smell. Eventually, Mei has to move out when the authorities are about to capture her. Mrs. Li, now two months pregnant despite being declared infertile earlier, is still desperate for a rejuvenation and chooses to abort her own fetus, presumably to make it into dumplings.

Cut
A successful film director has to face a night of misery when a man who appeared in all five of his films as an extra captures both him and his wife to play a deadly game. The wife, a pianist, is gagged and trapped in a system of sharp wires at her piano. The director is instructed to strangle a young girl the extra met earlier in the day, or else the extra will chop off the wife's fingers one by one every five minutes. The extra reveals that he kidnapped the couple because he is jealous that the director is able to be a rich and good man, while he is poor and abusive to his wife and son, the former of whom he murdered before the incident.

The director tries to buy time by telling stories of his infidelity, though the extra continues to chop the wife's fingers until only one remains on her left hand. The director ultimately decides to kill the young girl by strangling her. He tries, but does not quite succeed in killing her. The young girl's wig comes off and she is revealed to be a boy — the extra's son. The extra is only stopped when he slips after stepping on a bloody ring that the wife was wearing before he chopped off her ring finger. The wife then bites the extra's neck, pushing him into the wires that imprison her, leaving him bleeding to death. Traumatized and delusional, the director, now believing his wife to be the extra's son and vice versa, strangles her to death.

Box
Kyoko, a 25-year-old novelist, frequently experiences nightmares of her past as a circus performer. Back when she was 10 years old, Kyoko worked in a circus with her twin sister Shoko and their benefactor Higata. Kyoko felt that Higata was favoring Shoko over her when he praised her after a performance. When Shoko was training, Kyoko forced and locked her into a box. However, Higata watched the incident and tried to rescue her, only for Kyoko to scar him in the face and then accidentally set the box on fire. Since then, Kyoko is haunted with guilt and wants to apologize to her sister. She is also struck uncannily by her literature publisher, Yoshii, who is a doppelgänger of Higata, except that he is more caring to her.

One day, Kyoko follows an invitation to her old circus, only to discover the box containing Shoko's burned remains. She is confronted by Higata, who is distraught after the incident and tells her that both Kyoko and Shoko are important to him, but only as one entity. After luring her into kissing him, he forces her into a plastic sack, fits it into a box, then buries it in the nearby snowy ground. However, it is revealed that the entire event of the film is just another dream of Kyoko, who in reality has been conjoined with Shoko since birth. The sisters exit the house to meet with Higata/Yoshii, both indeed the same person.

Cast

Dumplings
 Miriam Yeung as Mrs Li
 Bai Ling as Mei
 Pauline Lau as Li's maid 
 Tony Leung Ka-fai as Li
 Meme Tian as Connie

Cut
 Lee Byung-hun as Director
 Im Won-hee as Stranger
 Kang Hye-jung as Director's wife
 Yum Jung-ah as actress in vampire role

Box
 Kyōko Hasegawa as Kyoko
 Atsuro Watabe as Yoshii/Higata
 Mai Suzuki as Young Kyoko
 Yuu Suzuki as Young Shoko

Dumplings theatrical

Three... Extremes''' first film Dumplings was extended and turned into a full-length theatrical film of the same name that was released into British cinemas by Tartan Films in the spring of 2006.

ReleaseThree... Extremes was theatrically released on October 28, 2005 by Lionsgate. After its release on November 17, 2005, the film has grossed $77,532 in North America and $1,516,056 in other territories, for a worldwide total of $1,593,588.

Critical responseThree...Extremes received generally positive reviews. Review aggregator Rotten Tomatoes gave the film an 84% approval rating based on 62 reviews, with an average rating of 6.8 out of 10; its consensus reads: "This anthology contains brutal, powerful horror stories by three of Asia's top directors." Metacritic, which assigns a normalized rating out of 100 to reviews from mainstream critics, gave the film an average score of 66 out of 100 based on 22 reviews, indicating "generally favorable reviews".Chicago Sun-Times critic Roger Ebert praised the film by giving it 3½ stars out of 4, describing the films as "deeply, profoundly creepy", and he attributed their qualities to the works of famous horror writers Edgar Allan Poe, H.P. Lovecraft and Stephen King. The New York Times Dana Stevens gave a positive review, writing: "Though Three Extremes  may seem tame to jaded fans of what has been termed New Asian Horror, it serves as a fine introduction to the genre for those who are curious but squeamish." The Boston Globe's'' Ty Burr gave a favorable review, advising viewers to "fasten your seat belts for a bumpy ride -- narratively and artistically -- and don't go in on a full stomach."

References

External links
 
 
 
 
 

2000s Cantonese-language films
2000s Japanese-language films
2000s Korean-language films
2000s Mandarin-language films
2004 horror films
2004 films
Hong Kong psychological thriller films
Japanese horror anthology films
South Korean psychological thriller films
Japanese psychological thriller films
2000s psychological thriller films
Films directed by Takashi Miike
Films directed by Park Chan-wook
Lionsgate films
Films directed by Fruit Chan
Films about cannibalism
South Korean horror anthology films
Hong Kong psychological horror films
Japanese psychological horror films
South Korean psychological horror films
2000s Japanese films
2000s South Korean films
2000s Hong Kong films